QRNG may refer to:

 Quantum random number generator, a random number generator based on quantum phenomena
 Quasirandom Number Generator, a function that generates a series of numbers that fill some range in an even pattern
 Quinolone-resistant neisseria gonorrhoeae

See also

References